Georges Alphonse de La Fouchardière (February 1874 - 10 February 1946) was a French writer and journalist. He wrote for the Canard enchaîné (creator of the "Chronique du Bouif"), at L'Œuvre, as well as being the author of several literary works, notably La Chienne, a story adapted for film by Jean Renoir under the same title and by Fritz Lang as Scarlet Street.

References

External links

French journalists
1874 births
1946 deaths